Harbury is a surname. Notable people with the surname include:

 Charles Harbury ( 1843–1928), English-born stage actor
 Jennifer Harbury (born 1951), American lawyer, author, and human rights activist
 Pehr Harbury (born 1965), American biochemist